A half marathon is a road running event of —half the distance of a marathon. It is common for a half marathon event to be held concurrently with a marathon or a 5K race, using almost the same course with a late start, an early finish or shortcuts.  If finisher medals are awarded, the medal or ribbon may differ from those for the full marathon. The half marathon is also known as a 21K, 21.1K, or 13.1 miles, although these values are rounded and not formally correct.

A half marathon world record is officially recognised by the International Association of Athletics Federations. The official IAAF world record for men is 57:31, set by Jacob Kiplimo of Uganda in November 2021 in Lisbon, Portugal, and for women is 1:04:02, set by Ruth Chepng'etich of Kenya on April 4, 2021, in Istanbul, Turkey.
Participation in half marathons has grown steadily since 2003, partly because it is a challenging distance, but does not require the same level of training that a marathon does. In 2008, Running USA reported that the half marathon is the fastest-growing type of race.

All-time top 25

Men
Correct .

Notes
Below is a list of other times equal or superior to 58:43:
Jacob Kiplimo also ran 57:37 (2020) and 57:56 (2022).
Rhonex Kipruto also ran 58:09 (2021).
Kibiwott Kandie also ran 58:10 (2022), 58:38 (2020).
Abraham Kiptum ran 58:18, but it was expunged for doping.
Zersenay Tadese also ran 58:30 (2011).
Philemon Kiplimo also ran 58:34 (2021).
Daniel Mateiko also ran 58:40 (2022).

Women
Correct .

Notes
Below is a list of other times equal or superior to 1:05:28:
Yalemzerf Yehualaw also ran 1:03:44   (2021, not legal), 1:04:22  (2022), 1:04:40  (2021), 1:04:46 (2020), 1:05:19 (2020).
Brigid Kosgei  also ran 1:04:28   (2019), 1:05:28 (2019).
Hellen Obiri also ran 1:04:48 (2022), 1:04:51  (2021).
Joyciline Jepkosgei also ran 1:04:51 (2017), 1:04:52 (2017).
Sheila Chepkirui also ran 1:04:53  (2021).
Ruth Chepngetich also ran 1:05:06 (2020).
Tsehay Gemechu also ran 1:05:08  (2021).
Joan Chelimo also ran 1:05:09  (2021).
Florence Jebet Kiplagat also ran 1:05:12 (2014).
Mary Jepkosgei Keitany also ran 1:05:13 (2017).
Peres Jepchirchir also ran 1:05:16 (2020).
Ababel Yeshaneh also ran 1:05:21 (2020).

Season's bests

This table lists the best half marathon performances per year since 1970, as recorded by the ARRS.

The largest half marathon ever held was Broloppet (the Bridge race) between Copenhagen in Denmark and Malmö in Sweden with  finishers, held in connection with the Øresund Bridge inauguration in 2000.

See also

 List of half marathon races
 World Athletics Half Marathon Championships
 Mini marathon
 Quarter marathon
 Half marathon world record progression
 One hour run

Notes

References

Further reading

External links

IAAF list of half-marathon records in XML

 
Road running distances
Long-distance running distances